Alsophila woodwardioides is a species of tree fern native to Jamaica, Cuba and Hispaniola (the Dominican Republic).

References

woodwardioides
Flora of Jamaica
Flora of Cuba
Flora of the Dominican Republic
Flora without expected TNC conservation status